The  is a mid-size car built by Toyota. It was launched in 1980 and shared the chassis with the Mark II/Cressida, sold at Toyopet Store dealerships in Japan. The goal of the Cresta was a higher level of luxury in comparison to the Mark II, while the Chaser was the performance-oriented version of the Mark II, but sold at different dealerships. Often available with two-tone paint and more interior convenience options, with the result ending up being more similar to the Cressida sold in export markets. The Cresta was produced for five generations, and production eventually ceased in 2001, when it was merged with the Chaser to form the short lived Verossa.

The name "Cresta" is Italian/Spanish for "crest", a type of ornament found on a helmet.



X50-X60 series (1980–1984)

The first Cresta was introduced April 1980 and was available exclusively at the renamed Toyota Vista Store (formerly Toyota Auto Store) sales channels across Japan, joining the X40 Chaser. The Cresta was positioned as a high-level luxury sedan just below the established, traditional luxury sedan, the Crown. The Cresta was introduced with halogen headlights to provide a modern European appearance, and was available with a full range of luxury amenities and conveniences. The SOHC 2.0 L M-EU engine was used with an automatic transmission only, which was shared with the Crown, as well as the 2.0L 1G-EU straight six engine, also used in the Crown. Trim levels used names meant to suggest luxury overtones, such as Super Lucent, Super Touring, Super Deluxe, Super Custom, and Custom, names that were similarly used on the Crown. Upper level trim levels used two-tone paint schemes to further the Cresta's elevated status towards a younger demographic. The Nissan competitor was the Laurel.

This new luxury approach was well received with buyers. In August 1983, Toyota chairman Eiji Toyoda initiated the F1 project ("Flagship" and "No. 1 vehicle"; alternatively called the "Circle-F" project), a clandestine effort aimed at producing a world-class luxury sedan for international markets. This led to the creation of an all new, full size luxury sedan designed for export markets, called the Lexus LS.

X70 series (1984–1988)

The X70 series was introduced March 8, 1984, with styling cues shared with the platform sharing Mark II, with the Cresta now offered as a 4-door, 4-window sedan (with window frames) while the X70 Mark II was offered as a 4-window hardtop bodystyle similar to the Chaser, alongside a 6-window style Mark II sedan. The Cresta has a distinct, creased rear windshield. The X70 series continued to enjoy the popularity enjoyed by the first generation Cresta. Power side view mirrors were now installed western style at the leading edge of the front doors instead of on the front fenders above the front wheels to provide a more modern appearance, and retracted electrically for confined parking spaces. The 2.2-litre diesel engine used in the first generation was upgraded to one with 2.4 litres displacement.

Styling upgrades and engine changes were introduced in 1985. The twin turbo 1G-GTEU was introduced in October 1985, with the trim level designation GT Twin Turbo. As a result of the twin turbo introduction, the M-TEU engine was no longer offered. Foglights imbedded in the front bumper were made standard equipment, with another minor styling upgrade August 1986.

X80 series (1988–1992)

The third generation was introduced March 8, 1988, with a transition away from straight edges previously used by Toyota products of the period and it was no longer a hardtop sedan. The top-of-the-line model, called the Super Lucent G included a supercharger equipped 1G-GZE engine. The 1JZ-GE and 1JZ-GTE were shared with the Chaser.  Special anniversary trim levels were introduced May 1990, with a body refresh introduced later that year.

X90 series (1992–1996)

The X90 Cresta debuted in 1992 with significant styling and mechanical changes over the X80. The car increased in size and gained some new trim levels similar to its sister cars, the Mark II and Chaser. Engines were carried over from the past generation albeit without the 7M or supercharged 1G I6's. Toyota also changed the front grille and taillight design in 1994. Under Japanese exterior dimension regulations, this series was no longer regarded as a "compact car".

The X90 Cresta was offered in 4 primary trim levels throughout its run (the SC, Suffire, Super Lucent and Tourer), each with their own options and even more specific trim categorizations. All cars shared common longitudinal layout architecture as well as certain options standard, like automatic climate control and side-impact bars, not to mention driver-side airbags in 1995. The base trim level SC had very little in terms of options; it was powered by either a petrol or diesel engine mated to a 4-speed automatic. The next level Suffire had the same options available (or lack thereof) as the SC plus an optional 5-speed manual.

The Super Lucent however was a much different story: this trim offered 3 different straight 6 engines from 2.0L-3.0L mated to an electronically controlled 4-speed automatic with options like a moon roof or a factory LSD. Further differentiating Super Lucent models was the G package, which featured ABS, 15" wheels, cruise control and a leather interior. Permanent 4WD was offered as an option in 1993. The various sized engine displacements gave Japanese buyers choices as to which annual road tax obligation they were willing to pay.

The Tourer trim levels all featured a 2.5L 1JZ straight 6, but with a few differences. The Tourer S had a naturally aspirated engine and only a 4-speed automatic whereas the Tourer V's came with a pair of turbochargers and the option of a 5-speed manual. All Tourers had front- and rear-stabilizer bars but only the Tourer V's came with traction control, ABS and an LSD standard. Tourer V's were very popular amongst enthusiasts and drifters due to their stiff chassis and power-to-weight ratio.

X100 series (1996–2001)

In 1996 the X100 series was released. Although dimension are extremely similar to the X90 series, the X100 series Cresta boasts an extra  in weight, in part because of stricter safety regulations.

Predecessor to the Toyota Verossa, the new Cresta X100 series started its differences from the X90 series with an updated front and rear end. The new generation Cresta also lost its previous generation's 1.8L 4S-FE I4 engine option.

The Cresta, along with the Chaser, ceased production in 2001 (the Mark II saw one more generation, the X110, before production ceased in 2004) to make way for its replacement, the Toyota Verossa.

The Cresta came in four different trim levels: SC, Exceed, Super Lucent, and Roulant.

In popular culture
The car is notable for featuring in the anime and manga Great Teacher Onizuka, in which it is owned by Hiroshi Uchiyamada, whose car gets destroyed multiple times after a series of mishaps.

References

External links

Toyota Cresta Technical Wikipedia (@ JZX World – jzx100.com)

1990s cars
2000s cars
Cresta
Luxury vehicles
Sports sedans
Cars introduced in 1980
Cars discontinued in 2001